Elifasi Msomi a.k.a. The Axe Killer (1910 – 10 February 1956) was a South African serial killer who was convicted in 1955 of 15 murders and sentenced to death by hanging. His victims all came from the Umkomaas and Umzimkulu valleys of Natal.

A Zulu man, Msomi was an unsuccessful young sangoma (shaman). Seeking professional assistance, he consulted with another sangoma. Msomi claims that during this exchange he was co-opted by an evil spirit, a tokoloshe. In August 1953, under the instruction of the tokoloshe, Msomi began an 18-month killing spree in the southern KwaZulu-Natal valleys of South Africa.

Msomi initially raped and murdered a young woman in the presence of his mistress, whose blood he kept in a bottle. Unimpressed with his 'new' powers, his mistress alerted the police who arrested Msomi. He escaped shortly afterwards, giving credit for his escape to the all-powerful tokoloshe. Msomi returned to his murderous ways, killing five children before being re-arrested. He duly escaped again. Msomi was arrested a month later for petty theft. The stolen items turned out to belong to his victims and he was soon identified as the murderous culprit.

Msomi readily assisted the police in finding some of his victims' remains, including a missing skull. Whether he gained further satisfaction from revisiting his crime scenes or felt diminished responsibility in light of the tokoloshe's influence is unclear. During his trial, Msomi claimed that he was merely a conduit for the evil tokoloshe. Two psychologists disagreed, stating that Msomi was in fact of much higher than average intelligence and further that he derived sexual pleasure from inflicting pain. Msomi was sentenced to death by hanging at Pretoria Central Prison.

Msomi's reference to the tokoloshe and his numerous escapes had however caused a high level of consternation amongst some of the Zulu community. Upon request, the judge permitted a deputation of nine Zulu chiefs and elders to attend the hanging in order to confirm that the tokoloshe did in fact not save Msomi from his death. Even so, one chief felt that Msomi might return after death as a tokoloshe himself.

See also

List of serial killers by country
List of serial killers by number of victims

References 

Axe murder
1910 births
1956 deaths
20th-century executions by South Africa
Crimes involving Satanism or the occult
Escapees from South African detention
Executed South African serial killers
Male serial killers
South African people convicted of murder
People convicted of murder by South Africa
People executed by South Africa by hanging
South African escapees
Zulu people